Jewish folklore are legends, music, oral history, proverbs, jokes, popular beliefs, fairy tales, stories, tall tales, and customs that are the traditions of Judaism. Folktales are characterized by the presence of unusual personages, by the sudden transformation of men into beasts and vice versa, or by other unnatural incidents. A number of aggadic stories bear folktale characteristics, especially those relating to Og, King of Bashan, which have the same exaggerations as have the lügenmärchen of modern German folktales.

Middle Ages
There is considerable evidence of Jewish people bringing and helping the spread of Eastern folktales in Europe. Besides these tales from foreign sources, Jews either collected or composed others which were told throughout the European ghettos, and were collected in Yiddish in the "Maasebücher". Numbers of the folktales contained in these collections were also published separately.<ref>See the earlier ones given by Moritz Steinschneider in Hebrew Books in the Bodleian Library, Oxford (Catalogus Librorum Hebræorum in Bibliotheca Bodleiana), Berlin, 1852-60), Nos. 3869-3942</ref> It is, however, difficult to call many of them folktales in the sense given above, since nothing fairy-like or supernormal occurs in them.

Legends

There are a few definitely Jewish legends of the Middle Ages which partake of the character of folktales, such as those of the Jewish pope Andreas and of the golem, or that relating to the wall of the Rashi chapel, which moved backward in order to save the life of a poor woman who was in danger of being crushed by a passing carriage in the narrow way.

Aggadah and folklore compilations
 The Legends of the Jews by Rabbi Louis Ginzberg, is an original synthesis of a vast amount of aggadah from the Mishnah, the two Talmuds and Midrash. Ginzberg had an encyclopedic knowledge of all rabbinic literature, and his masterwork included a massive array of aggadot. However he did not create an anthology which showed these aggadot distinctly.  Rather, he paraphrased them and rewrote them into one continuous narrative that covered five volumes, followed by two volumes of footnotes that give specific sources.
The Ein Yaakov is a compilation of the aggadic material in the Babylonian Talmud together with commentary.Sefer Ha-Aggadah, "The Book of Legends" is a classic compilation of aggadah from the Mishnah, the two Talmuds and the Midrash literature. It was edited by Hayim Nahman Bialik and Yehoshua Hana Rawnitzki. Bialik and Ravnitzky worked to compile a comprehensive and representative overview of aggadah; they spent three years compiling their work. When they found the same aggadah in multiple versions, from multiple sources, they usually selected the later form, the one found in the Babylonian Talmud. However they also presented a great some aggadot sequentially, giving the early form from the Jerusalem Talmud, and later versions from the Babylonian Talmud, and from a classic midrash compilation. In each case each every aggadah is given with its original source. In their original edition, they translated the Aramaic aggadot into modern Hebrew. Sefer Ha-Aggadah was first published in 1908–11 in Odessa, Russia, then reprinted numerous times in Israel. In 1992 it was translated into English as "The Book of Legends", by William G, Braude.
 Mimekor Yisrael, by Micha Josef (bin Gorion) Berdyczewski. Berdyczewski was interested in compiling the folklore and legends of the Jewish people, from the earliest times up until the dawn of the modern era. His collection included a large array of aggadot, although they were limited to those he considered within the domain of folklore.

See also
 Jewish mythology
 Valley of the ants, a Jewish legend

References

Further reading
Analytical studies
 Jason, Heda. "Types of Jewish-Oriental Oral Tales". In: Fabula 7, no. Jahresband (1965): 115–224. https://doi.org/10.1515/fabl.1965.7.1.115
 Jason, Heda. "Study of Israelite and Jewish Oral and Folk Literature: Problems and Issues". In: Asian Folklore Studies 49, no. 1 (1990): 69-108. Accessed May 18, 2021. doi:10.2307/1177950.
 Noy, Dov. "The First Thousand Folktales in the Israel Folktale Archives". In: Fabula 4, no. 1 (1961): 99-110. https://doi.org/10.1515/fabl.1961.4.1.99

Compilations
 Gaster, Moses. The exempla of the rabbis; being a collection of exempla, apologues and tales culled from Hebrew manuscripts and rare Hebrew books. London; Leipzig: The Asia Pub. Co., 1924. 
 Schwartz, Howard. Elijah's violin and other Jewish folktales''. Harmondsworth: Penguin, 1987.

 
Middle Eastern folklore